Keith Williams may refer to:

Sports
 Keith Williams (baseball) (born 1972), San Francisco Giants baseball player
 Keith Williams (basketball, born 1965), American basketball player
 Keith Williams (basketball, born 1998), American basketball player

Football
 Keith Williams (bodybuilder) (born 1973), and former American footballer
 Keith Williams (Australian footballer) (1926–2004), Fitzroy VFL footballer
 Keith Williams (footballer, born 1937), footballer for Everton, Tranmere Rovers, Plymouth Argyle and Bristol Rovers
 Keith Williams (footballer, born 1957), footballer for Aston Villa, Northampton Town and Bournemouth
 Keith Williams (cornerback) (born 1983), Canadian football cornerback
 Keith Williams (offensive lineman) (born 1988), Pittsburgh Steelers football player

Others
 Keith Williams (architect) (born 1958), British architect
 Keith Williams (businessman), British businessman
 Keith Williams (comics) (born 1957), American comic book and comic strip artist
 Keith Daniel Williams (1947–1996), American triple murderer
 Keith David (Keith David Williams, born 1956), American actor
 Keith P. Williams, American politician, member of the North Carolina General Assembly
 Keith Williams (developer) (1929–2011), Australian entrepreneur
 Keith Williams, Jamaican reggae singer better known as Honey Boy
 Keith Williams, character in Ambush at Cimarron Pass
 Keith Williams, winner of 2003 Jeopardy! College Championship and creator of The Final Wager

See also

 William Keith (disambiguation)
 
 Williams (disambiguation)
 Keith (disambiguation)